Brecher or Bröcher is a surname. Notable people with the surname include:

 Amaya Brecher, cast member of The Real World: Hawaii
 Aviva Brecher (born 1945), American applied physicist and transportation scientist
 Bob Brecher (born 1949), British philosopher
  (born 1951), Israeli historian and author
 Edward M. Brecher (1912–1989), American author
 Egon Brecher (1880–1946), Austro-Hungarian actor and director
 Gary Brecher (born July 1955), American military writer
 Gideon Brecher (1797–1873), Jewish Bohemian-Austrian physician and writer
 Gustav Brecher (1879–1940), Jewish Bohemian-German conductor and composer
 Irving Brecher (1914–2008), American screenwriter
 Jeremy Brecher, historian, documentary filmmaker, activist, and author 
 John Brecher, wine columnist of The Wall Street Journal
 Mark Elliott Brecher (born 1956), Retired Chief Medical Officer LabCorp, Emeritus Professor University of North Carolina 
 Michael Brecher (born 1925), Canadian academic in political science
 Steve Brecher (born 1945), American professional poker player

See also
 4242 Brecher, asteroid
 Brecker

German-language surnames